DYDD (1260 AM) El Nuevo Bantay Radyo was an AM station owned and operated by Sarraga Integrated and Management Corporation. The station's studio and transmitter were located in Cebu City. This station is currently off-air due to management issues. However, it revived in 2022 with new Nautel 10kW AM Stereo transmitter.

References

Radio stations in Metro Cebu
Radio stations established in 1991
Radio stations disestablished in 2015
1991 establishments in the Philippines
2015 disestablishments in the Philippines
Defunct radio stations in the Philippines